The Society for Pediatric Radiology is a professional association of pediatric radiologists. The Society publishes the journal Pediatric Radiology and holds a yearly meeting. It was founded in 1958 at an informal meeting in Washington, DC, United States. Instrumental in its founding were John Caffey, Edward Neuhauser, and Frederic Silverman.

See also 
 Radiology
 Radiological Society of North America

References

External links 
 

Medical associations based in the United States
Radiology organizations
Organizations established in 1958
Pediatric organizations
Medical and health organizations based in Virginia
1958 establishments in the United States